East Wretham Heath is a  biological Site of Special Scientific Interest south-east of Thetford in Norfolk. It is a Nature Conservation Review site, Grade I, and it is managed by the Norfolk Wildlife Trust. it is part of the Breckland Special Area of Conservation and Special Protection Area.

The principal ecological interest of this site lies in areas of Breckland grassland and two meres, which are supplied by ground water, and fluctuate irregularly. These conditions have led to unusual plants communities which are tolerant of alternate wetting and drying, such as reed canary grass and amphibious bistort.

There is public access to the reserve.

References

Sites of Special Scientific Interest in Norfolk
Norfolk Wildlife Trust
Special Protection Areas in England
Special Areas of Conservation in England
Nature Conservation Review sites